Pop'yŏng Ch'ŏngnyŏn station is a railway station in Kimhyŏngjik-ŭp, Kimhyŏngjik-kun, Ryanggang Province, North Korea, on the Pukbunaeryuk Line of the Korean State Railway.

History

The station, originally called Huch'ang station, was opened on 3 August 1988 by the Korean State Railway, along with the rest of the second section of the Pukpu Line between Chasŏng and Huju. When the town of Huch'ang was renamed Kimhyŏngjik, the station was also renamed, but called Pop'yŏng station instead of "Kimhyŏngjik station". It received its current name around 2012.

References

Railway stations in North Korea